Simnel cake is a fruitcake widely eaten in the United Kingdom, Ireland and other countries with patterns of migration from them, associated with Lent and Easter. It is distinguished by layers of almond paste or marzipan, typically one in the middle and one on top, and a set of eleven balls made of the same paste. It was originally made for the fourth Sunday in Lent, also known as Laetare Sunday, the Refreshment Sunday of Lent (when the 40-day fast would be relaxed), Mothering Sunday, the Sunday of the Five Loaves, or Simnel Sunday; named after the cake. In the United Kingdom it is now commonly associated with Easter Sunday.

Decoration 

Conventionally, 11 marzipan balls are used to decorate the cake, symbolising the 12 apostles minus Judas Iscariot, or occasionally 12 are used, representing Jesus and the 11 apostles. However, an early reference to decorating with marzipan balls appears in May Byron's Pot-Luck Cookery, but with no mention of this story, and her version may well be derived from earlier styles, which were sometimes crenelated.

Ingredients

Simnel cake is a light fruitcake, generally made from these ingredients: white flour, sugar, butter, eggs, fragrant spices, dried fruits, zest and candied peel. Sometimes orange flower water or brandy is used, either in the cake batter or to flavour the almond paste. In most modern versions marzipan or almond paste is used as a filling for the cake, with a layer laid in the middle of the mix before the cake is cooked, and it is also used as decoration on the top. Most recipes require at least 90 minutes of cooking, and advise using several layers of baking parchment to line the tin, and sometimes brown paper wrapped around the outside to stop the marzipan burning.

History

Simnel cakes have been known since at least medieval times. Bread regulations of the time suggest they were boiled and then baked, a technique which led to an invention myth, in circulation from at least 1745 until the 1930s, whereby a mythical couple, Simon and Nelly, fall out over making a Simnel. One wishes to boil it, one to bake it and, after beating each other with various household implements, they compromise on one which uses both cooking techniques. 

Simnel cakes are often associated with Mothering Sunday, also known as Simnel Sunday. According to historian Ronald Hutton, in 17th Century Gloucestershire and Worcestershire the custom of live-in apprentices and domestic servants going home to visit their mothers on Mothering Sunday started, checking that their families were well and taking food or money if needed. This was a time of year when food stocks were low, and the high-calorie simnel cake was useful nutrition. The cake later became simply an Easter cake.

The meaning of the word "simnel" is unclear: there is a 1226 reference to "bread made into a simnel", which is understood to mean the finest white bread, from the Latin , "fine flour" (from which 'semolina' also derives). John de Garlande felt that the word was equivalent to placenta cake, a cake that was intended to please.

Variations

Different towns had their own recipes and shapes of the Simnel cake. Both Bury and Shrewsbury produced large numbers to their own recipes. Chambers Book of Days (1869) contains an illustration of the Shrewsbury Simnel cake, of which says:

Today, in Shrewsbury, as elsewhere in England, the Simnel cake is usually made with the Bury recipe.

See also
 List of almond dishes
List of foods with religious symbolism
Mazurek (cake)

References

British cakes
Easter cakes
English traditions
Marzipan
Layer cakes